Kapil Dev Sharma (1920-2006) born in Gujaranwala (now in Pakistan) was an Indian scientist and technologist who specialized as a glass technologist.

Education 
Sharma successfully completed his BSc degree at Panjab University, a BSc (Glass Tech.) at Banaras Hindu University; and an MSc (Technology) from Sheffield.

Career 
He worked in the glass industry for about a year and in 1945 proceeded to UK for higher studies as a Government of India scholar. He carried out research work at Sheffield University under Prof. W.E.S. Turner, F.R.S., and Prof H. Moore. Sharma joined the institute as a scientific officer in September, 1948 and was associated with the planning and development of the institute from almost the beginning. During 1953–54, he worked at the Glass Section of the National Bureau of Standards, US, as a guest worker. He was assistant director in 1954, deputy director in 1960 and director from 1967 to 1980 of the Central Glass and Ceramic Research Institute.

He has also served with the United Nations Development Program as a glass expert for several short term assignments in Cuba and Jamaica among other places.

Fellow 
Society of Glass Technology, U.K.; Institute of Ceramics, UK; President, Indian Institute of Ceramics; President, Indian Ceramic Society.

Member 
He visited the USSR in 1959 as a member of the Government of India Expert Team for the optical and ophthalmic glass project. He also went to US and UK in 1962 as alternate leader of the NPC Study Team on Glass Industry; Member International Commission on Glass; and Chairman of ISI Sectional Committee for Glassware.

Awards and honors 
He was awarded the R G Nail Gold Medal from M S University, Baroda.

The "K.D. Sharma Memorial Lecture" has also been instituted.

A multipurpose hall has also been made at the Central Glass and Ceramic Research Institute complex in Kolkata.

Notable contribution 
 Development and production of optical glass, which is a strategic defence material for the first time in India
 Development of foam glass
 radiation shielding windows for nuclear reactors and glass melting furnaces
 glass raw materials
 productivity
 Filed 3 patents.

Miscellaneous 
His name also appears in the book, "Who's who in the world".

References 

Glass engineering and science
People from Gujranwala
1920 births
2006 deaths
Indian chemical engineers